{{DISPLAYTITLE:Copper (64Cu) oxodotreotide}}

Copper (64Cu) oxodotreotide or Copper Cu 64 dotatate, sold under the brand name Detectnet, is a radioactive diagnostic agent indicated for use with positron emission tomography (PET) for localization of somatostatin receptor positive neuroendocrine tumors (NETs) in adults.

Common side effects include nausea, vomiting and flushing.

It was approved for medical use in the United States in September 2020.

History 
The U.S. Food and Drug Administration (FDA) approved copper 64Cu dotatate based on data from two trials that evaluated 175 adults.

Trial 1 evaluated adults, some of whom had known or suspected NETs and some of whom were healthy volunteers. The trial was conducted at one site in the United States (Houston, TX). Both groups received copper 64Cu dotatate and underwent PET scan imaging.

Trial 2 data came from the literature-reported trial of 112 adults, all of whom had history of NETs and underwent PET scan imaging with copper 64Cu dotatate. The trial was conducted at one site in Denmark. In both trials, copper 64Cu dotatate images were compared to either biopsy results or other images taken by different techniques to detect the sites of a tumor. The images were read as either positive or negative for presence of NETs by three independent image readers who did not know participant clinical information.

See also 
 Copper-64
 DOTA-TATE

References

External links 
 
 

Radiopharmaceuticals
Orphan drugs
DOTA (chelator) derivatives
Copper complexes